Michael Sarne (1883–1961) was an American writer who under the pseudonym Thomas Arthur Plummer was a popular crime fiction and mystery writer of the 1930s.

His main series character was Inspector Andrew Frampton.

References

1883 births
1961 deaths